Mami (まみ, マミ) is a feminine Japanese given name.

Possible writings
Mami can be written using different kanji characters and can mean:
真美, "true, beauty"
真実, "truth"
茉美, "jasmine, beauty"
麻実, "hemp, truth"
麻美, "hemp, beauty"
茉海, "jasmine, sea"
舞美, "dance, beauty"
待実, "wait, truth"
待満, "wait, satisfy"
増実, "increase, truth"
麻弥, "hemp, complete"

The name can also be written in hiragana, まみ or katakana, マミ.

People
Mami Ayukawa (鮎川 麻弥; born 1961), Japanese singer
Mami Deguchi (出口 茉美; born 1985), Japanese voice actress
Mami Higashiyama (東山 麻美; born 1977), Japanese actress and singer
Mami Horikoshi (堀越 真己; born 1960), Japanese voice actress
Mami Ishino (石野 真美; born 1983), Japanese hurdler
, Japanese field hockey player
Mami Kataoka (片岡 真実 Japanese art curator and writer
Mami Kawada (川田 まみ; J-pop singer from Sapporo, Japan
Mami Kingetsu (金月 真美; born 1965), Japanese voice actress
Mami Kosuge (小菅 真美; born 1974), Japanese voice actress
Mami Koyama (小山 茉美; born 1955), Japanese voice actress
Mami Kudo  (工藤真実; born 1964), Japanese ultramarathon runner
Mami Matsuyama (松山 まみ; born 1988), Japanese idol and cosplayer
Mami Mizutori (水鳥真美; (born 1960), Japanese diplomat
Mami Naito (内藤 真実; born 1986), Japanese badminton player
Mami Nakamura (中村 麻美; born 1979), Japanese actress
Mami Nomura (野村 真美; born 1964), Japanese actress
Mami Sasazaki (笹崎まみ), Japanese lead guitarist of SCANDAL
Mami Sato, Japanese bassist of the American rock band, The Warlocks
Mami Shimamoto (嶋本 麻美; born 1987), Japanese weightlifter
, Japanese biathlete
, Japanese volleyball player
Mami Yamaguchi (山口 麻美; born 1986), Japanese soccer player
Mami Yamasaki (山崎 真実; born 1985), Japanese gravure idol
Mami Yoshida (吉田 真未; born 1986), Japanese volleyball player

Fictional characters
Mami Inagaki, a character from Strike Witches
Mami Kuroi, a character in the manga and anime series Hell Teacher Nūbē
Mami Teramoto, a character from the English-language webcomic series Megatokyo
Mami Tomoe (巴 マミ), a character from Puella Magi Madoka Magica
Mami Honda (本多マミ), a character from the manga Gals! and its anime adaption, Super GALS! Kotobuki Ran 
Mami Kosaka (高坂 マミ), a character in the tokusatsu series Guruguru Medaman
Mami Nanami (七海 麻美), a character from the manga and anime Rent-A-Girlfriend

See also
Esper Mami, a manga created by Fujiko F. Fujio in 1977
Creamy Mami, the Magic Angel, a magical girl anime series
Mami Wata, type of African spirit

Japanese feminine given names